Samuel Eddy Barrett (1834–1912) was a Chicago industrialist and Major in the American Civil War. He was born in 1834 in Boston, Massachusetts. He moved to Chicago, Illinois and in 1857 founded the manufacturing firm Barrett, Powell & Arnold, which later became S.E. Barrett Manufacturing Company. He volunteered in the 1st Illinois Artillery Regiment, commanding its Company B. He was promoted to Major in 1863. Barrett married Alice D. Brush in 1868 and had six children. He worked with S.E. Barrett Manufacturing Company (later Barrett Manufacturing Company) until his death, while simultaneously acting as the head of the American Coal Products Company starting in 1903. Barrett died in 1912.

External links
 Samuel Eddy Barrett Family Papers at Newberry Library

1834 births
1912 deaths
Businesspeople from Boston
American industrialists
Union Army officers
19th-century American businesspeople